Sir William McArthur,  (6 July 1809 – 16 November 1887) was an Anglo-Irish businessman and Lord Mayor of London, and a Liberal Party politician who sat in the House of Commons from 1868 to 1885.

Biography
McArthur was born at Malin, County Donegal, the son of Rev. John McArthur, a Methodist minister in Derry. In 1821 he was apprenticed to a woollen draper in Enniskillen. He moved to Lurgan in 1825 where he was a merchant and in 1831 established a drapery business in Derry initially in a partnership, but later on his own.  In 1841 his brother Alexander McArthur went to Australia and the business was trading with several destinations in Australia. McArthur became an alderman of Derry. In 1857 McArthur moved the business to the City of London where he also became chairman of the Star Assurance Company, and was a director of the City Bank, the Bank of Australasia and the Australian Telegraph Co. He was a JP for Surrey and a Deputy Lieutenant for the City of London.

McArthur was involved in the opening of Methodist College Belfast in 1865. At the 1865 general election McArthur stood unsuccessfully for Parliament in Pontefract. From 1867 to 1868 he was Sheriff of London and Middlesex. At the 1868 general election McArthur was elected as a member of parliament (MP) for Lambeth, and held the seat until borough was divided under the Redistribution of Seats Act 1885. He was elected an alderman of London for Coleman Street in 1872 and became Lord Mayor of London in 1880. He was one of the founders of the London Chamber of Commerce in 1881 and was made KCMG in 1882.

At the 1885 general election, McArthur stood as an Independent Liberal candidate in the new Newington West, but finished a poor third with 821 votes (16%).

He had several interests in social and reforming organisations, including the Orphan Working School of Haverstock Hill and Hornsey Rise, and the Aborigines' Protection Society. 
In 1883 he opened Centenary Hall, Cottington Street, Kennington, and is remembered on a commemorative stone.

McArthur died at the age of 78 and was buried in Norwood cemetery. Sir William left sums for Methodist College Belfast to build its girls boarding hall.
McArthur married Marianne McElwaine in 1843.

References

External links

|-

1809 births
1887 deaths
Liberal Party (UK) MPs for English constituencies
UK MPs 1868–1874
UK MPs 1874–1880
UK MPs 1880–1885
19th-century lord mayors of London
19th-century English politicians
19th-century Irish politicians
Politicians from County Donegal
Deputy Lieutenants of the City of London
Sheriffs of the City of London
Councillors in Derry (city)
Knights Commander of the Order of St Michael and St George
Burials at West Norwood Cemetery